Norman Butler may refer to:

 Norman Butler (polo) (1918-2011), American polo player and thoroughbred breeder
 Norman Butler (cricketer) (1930-2007), English cricketer